Prolactin regulatory element-binding protein is a protein that in humans is encoded by the PREB gene.

This gene encodes a protein that specifically binds to a Pit1-binding element of the prolactin (PRL) promoter. This protein may act as a transcriptional regulator and is thought to be involved in some of the developmental abnormalities observed in patients with partial trisomy 2p. This gene overlaps the abhydrolase domain containing 1 (ABHD1) gene on the opposite strand.

References

Further reading

External links